Bastardia is a genus of flowering plants in the mallow family, Malvaceae.

Selected species

 Bastardia angulata Guill. & Perr.
 Bastardia aristata Turcz.
 Bastardia berlandieri A.Gray
 Bastardia bivalvis (Cav.) Kunth – Escoba Babosa (Puerto Rico, the Virgin Islands)
 Bastardia conferta Garcke & K.Schum.
 Bastardia elegans K.Schum.
 Bastardia foetida (Cav.) Sweet
 Bastardia guayaquilensis Turcz.
 Bastardia hirsutissima Walp.
 Bastardia limensis R.E.Fr.
 Bastardia macrophylla Ulbr
 Bastardia meringioides Sessé & Moc.
 Bastardia parvifolia Kunth
 Bastardia plumosa (Presl) K.Schum.
 Bastardia triquetra Morales
 Bastardia violacea Standl.
 Bastardia viscosa (L.) Kunth – Viscid Mallow (Texas, Puerto Rico, the Virgin Islands, Central America, Venezuela, Colombia, Ecuador and Peru)

References

 Germplasm Resources Information Network (GRIN): Bastardia
 USDA - PLANTS database: Bastardia
 Missouri Botanical Gardens - VAST (VAScular Tropicos) nomenclatural database

Malveae
Malvaceae genera